Greg Hall (1946 – June 23, 2009) was an American poet.

Background
After some success in the Santa Cruz poetry scenes in the 1970s, Hall mostly ceased publishing his poetry, but he continued to write. In the 1970s, Hall and his family moved to San Jose. For many years Hall then lived alone in sparsely furnished apartments, doing clerical jobs in hospitals and psychiatric wards and writing poetry which he would share with other poets and friends privately, in small gatherings or by mailing off entire manuscripts. He would throw away months' or years' worth of his own poems, once he decided he was done with a particular track of writing and begin again. He had poems published in Ally, the the, radar, Alcatraz, Redwood Coast Review, Montserrat Review, the anthology Cuts from the Barbershop, and the anthology News of the Universe edited by Robert Bly.

Hall's writing was strongly intertwined with that of his friends such as F.A. Nettelbeck, Walter Martin, Stephen Kessler, and by the writers and musicians he loved including Jean Genet, Marcel Proust, Stéphane Mallarmé, Miles Davis, and Hank Williams. He had a Beat poet's willingness to range widely over human experience and language, mixing literary, poetic, and pop culture references with passionate love of experience and wry self-deprecation and wit.  He commented "Like everybody else I want what the poem wants to do, I want to be there when it does what it wants to do. We make these things. They're weird things, they don't look like other things, but they're like themselves." Poet Robert Bly noted "In Gregory Hall, "surrealism" is not a doctrine, but an admission of grief beyond his control."

Works
 Flame People, Green Horse Press, 1977. Preface by Robert Bly.
 Inamorata, Tollbooth Press, 2003.

Unpublished manuscripts and letters
 Diary of a Desert Fox
 Whoregasm
 Folder Numbers 160, 161, 181, 182, 204, 215 in the F.A. Nettelbeck Collection at Ohio State University Libraries: Rare Books and Manuscripts.

Recordings
 Audio CD in Cuts From the Barbershop
 Walter Martin & Greg Hall at KFJC January 2, 2005

References

External links
Hall works
July 03, 2009, Obituary 
Obituary 
Selected poems in the anthology Cuts From the Barbershop

American male poets
Poets from California
2009 deaths
1946 births
20th-century American poets
20th-century American male writers